Climate change in Israel refers to the effects of climate change attributed to man-made increases in atmospheric carbon dioxide in the nation of Israel. The Israeli Ministry of Environmental Protection has reported that climate change "will have a decisive impact on all areas of life, including: water, public health, agriculture, energy, biodiversity, coastal infrastructure, economics, nature, national security, and geostrategy", and will have the greatest effect on vulnerable populations such as the poor, the elderly, and the chronically ill.

Impacts
Due to substantial growth in vehicle use and emissions from coal- and oil-fired power plants, the presence of Nitrogen Oxides (NOx) and Sulfur Oxides (SOx) in the air near Israel's major urban centers have increased significantly between 1980 and 2002. Nitrogen oxides doubled twice during these years, CO2 increased by 190%, and incidents of respiratory illness among children increased from 5% to 17%. Although greenhouse gas emissions have steadily risen from 1996 to 2007, as of 2010 concentrations of Nitrogen oxides and other pollutants have decreased around major traffic sites. Additionally, falling Sulfur oxide levels have been observed and attributed to more efficient fuel use in industrial power plants. However, despite the effects of technology in lowering per-capita emissions, rapid population growth and increased per-capita consumption have led to an overall decrease in air quality. 

The Israel Meteorological Service has noted "a significant warming trend in all regions of the country". Each heatwave in Israel leads to 45 deaths on average.

In 2020, the Ministry of Environmental Protection noted that climate change is expected to reduce rainfall, decreasing the flow of the Jordan River by 22% and imperiling the availability of fresh water for the region. It also noted that at the same time, rising sea levels along the Mediterranean basin "will ultimately affect all of Israel's coasts, from Rosh Hanikra to the border of the Gaza Strip", potentially leading to saltwater infiltration of aquifer groundwater and degrading coastal cliffs, requiring "residences, hotels, heritage sites, factories, and the like to be moved". Yields of certain crops are expected to be damaged, as are industries for livestock and fishing.

Mitigation
According to the INDS of Israel, the main mitigation targets is to reduce per capita greenhouse gas emissions to 8.8 tCO2e by 2025 and to 7.7 tCO2e by 2030. Total emissions should be 81.65 MtCO2e in 2030. In business as usual scenario the emissions should be 105.5 MtCO2e by 2030 or 10.0 tCO2e per capita. To reach it, the government of Israel wants to reduce the consumption of electricity by 17% relative to business as usual scenario, produce 17% of electricity from renewables and shift 20% of transportation from cars to public transport by 2030.

In an effort to comply with GHG emission reductions, Israel formed a committee with the goal of evaluating the country's potential to reduce emissions by the year 2030. Their findings have confirmed that Israel's power sector generates approximately half of the country's total GHG emissions.  The second largest offender is the transport sector, which produces approximately 19% of total emissions.

A 2002 study by the Israeli Journal of Chemistry found that Israel's efforts to minimize the effects of chemical pollution and improve environmental quality have proven less effective than those of the EU and other countries.

When the Bennett-Lapid government was created in June 2021, the agreement between the political parties who formed it, included creating binding regulations for reduce GHG emissions.

In August 2021 the government adopted a target of reducing emissions by 27% by 2030 and by 85% by 2050. At the first time in the history of the country, it created a mechanism of carbon pricing. The carbon tax in Israel will be introduced in the years 2023–2028 and will cover 80% of emissions. Later it will expand further. It includes special measures for preventing negative impacts on the poor. It alone should reduce emissions by 67% by the year 2050.

In the same month Karine Elharrar the minister of energy stopped giving new licences for oil searching on land in Israel. According to Elharar priority will be given to renewable energy and fighting climate change. This is in contrast to her predecessor Yuval Steinitz, who preferred offshore gas drilling.

In December 2021 Karine Elharrar stopped the issuing of new licences for gas searching offshore at least for one year. She said the government would focus on green energy.

In 2021 Tamar Zandberg the minister of environment blocked the oil deal with UAE about increasing oil transportation from the Persian Gulf to Europe through Israel. This was made among other because of climate concerns.

In March 2022 the government adopted a resolution for closing the petrochemical zone in Haifa Bay in a decade. The decision is very important to fulfilling the climate pledges of Israel.

In May 2022 the government approved a climate law. The main points: reduce GHG emissions by 27% by the year 2030 compared to the base year (2015), reach zero emissions by 2050, an adaptation plan, considering climate risks before approving projects, creation of advisory and controlling comities, duty of reporting information about climate risks and emissions. The advisory comity will include: "a representative of the Manufacturers Association of Israel, a representative of environmental organizations and representatives of the younger generation."

International cooperation
Israel is party to several international agreements regarding air pollution and climate change, including the Kyoto Protocol, the UN Framework Convention on Climate Change and Montreal Protocol. Despite having taken these steps, Israel's environment continues to suffer as a rapidly growing population and standard of living contributes to increasing Green House Gas emissions and air pollutants. On 22 November 2016 Israel ratified the Paris Agreement. The country is part of three initiatives in mitigation and adaptation and 16 other action taken by non governmental actors.

See also
Environmental issues in Israel
 Plug-in electric vehicles in Israel
 Climate change in the Middle East and North Africa

References

Israel
Environment of Israel
Israel